The Moskstraumen or Moskenstraumen is a system of tidal eddies and whirlpools, one of the strongest in the world, that forms at the Lofoten archipelago in Nordland county, Norway between the Norwegian Sea and the Vestfjorden. It is located between the Lofoten Point on the island of Moskenesøya (in Moskenes Municipality) and the island of Mosken (in Værøy Municipality). Moskstraumen is unusual in that it occurs in the open sea whereas most other whirlpools are observed in confined straits or rivers. It originates from a combination of several factors, the dominant being the strong semi-diurnal tides and peculiar shape of the seabed, with a shallow ridge between the Moskenesøya and Værøya islands which amplifies and whirls the tidal currents.

The Moskstraumen has been featured in many historical accounts, generally exaggerated. It is also popularly known as maelstroma Nordic word (malstrøm/malström) for a strong whirlpool which originates from the Dutch combination of malen (to grind) and stroom (stream). This term was introduced into the English language by Edgar Allan Poe in 1841, through his short story "A Descent into the Maelström". Poe provides an alternative name for the whirlpool with the line: "We Norwegians call it the Moskoestrom, from the island of Moskoe in the midway."

Description and mechanism

The Moskstraumen is located between the Lofoten Point of the island of Moskenesøya (in Moskenes Municipality) and the small island of Mosken in Værøy Municipality.

The flow currents are strongest around July–August. There are regular tourist boat trips between Moskenesøya and Værøy.

The Moskstraumen is created as a result of a combination of several factors, including tides, strong local winds, position of the Lofoten and the underwater topography; unlike most other major maelstroms, such as Saltstraumen, Gulf of Corryvreckan, Naruto whirlpools, Old Sow whirlpool, and Skookumchuck Narrows, it is located in the open sea rather than in a strait or channel.

In literature

The Moskstraumen was described in the 13th century in the Old Norse poems Edda and remained an attractive subject for painters and writers, including Edgar Allan Poe, Walter Moers, and Jules Verne. The Swedish bishop Olaus Magnus included the Moskstraumen into his detailed report on the Nordic countries and their map, Carta Marina (1539). He attributed the whirlpool to divine forces and mentioned that it was much stronger than the previously known Sicilian whirlpool Charybdis. Most other writers of the time believed that the Moskstraumen played an important role in the ocean circulation, but, given a large number of tales and lack of scientific observations, grossly overestimated the size and power of the phenomenon. The Moskstraum, referred to simply as the Maelstrom, was the inspiration for Poe's short story "A Descent into the Maelström" (1841), which brought the term maelstrom, meaning strong whirlpool, into the English language. The Moskstraumen also features in the climax of Jules Verne's Twenty Thousand Leagues Under the Sea and is mentioned by Captain Ahab in Herman Melville's Moby-Dick. A likely source of information on Moskstraumen for those writers was a fictional description of the Moskstraumen by Jonas Danilssønn Ramus from 1715 which was translated into English and partly included into the 1823 edition of Encyclopædia Britannica. Poe quoted Jonas Ramus and Encyclopædia Britannica in his tale. The Moskstraumen is visited by characters in Liu Cixin's Death's End.

Rosa Arciniega's 1933 Spanish-language dystopian novel Mosko-Strom: El Torbellino de las Grandes Metrópolis references the Moskstraumen.

One of the first scientific descriptions of the Moskstraumen was presented by the Norwegian priest and poet Petter Dass in his poem "The Trumpet of Nordland" (published in 1739) which included a versified topographical description of northern Norway. There he clearly related the whirlpool with tides by noting that it was the strongest at full and new Moon and the weakest at half-Moon. He also noted that since the large fjords of the Moskenesøya had to be filled and emptied within 6 hours, the related water flow should create strong currents. Dass' novel was however not translated into English and remained unknown in Europe. The relation of the Moskstraumen with the tides was further mentioned by A. Schelderup in an article which was likely written in the 1750s and published in 1824.

See also
 Lofoten Vortex

References

External links

Den Norske Los, Bind 5: Rørvik-Lødingen og Andenes – Norwegian pilot guide with information about Mokstraumen (pages 234-236)
yr.no: Sea currents – real-time sea currents map from Norway
Edgar Allan Poe: A Descent Into the Maelstrom (1841) – complete text

Whirlpools
Bodies of water of Norway
Landforms of Nordland
Lofoten